Johnny Furdal (born 4 May 1986) is a Norwegian former professional footballer who played as a midfielder.

Career
Furdal has spent most of his career playing for Nest-Sotra. He played for the club for 11 years. Nest-Sotra retired his shirt number, 15, when he left the club in 2018.

On 26 July 2018, Furdal signed a two-and-a-half-year contract with Viking FK. He was named player of the year in the 2018 1. divisjon, after scoring 12 goals and making 14 assists. On 5 June 2020, his contract with Viking was extended until the end of the 2021 season. On 12 July 2021, he announced that he would retire at the end of the 2021 season.

Career statistics

Notes
League appearances between 2009 and 2011 are missing.

Honours
Viking
 Norwegian First Division: 2018
 Norwegian Football Cup: 2019

Individual
 Norwegian First Division player of the season: 2018

References

External links
 Profile for Viking FK

1986 births
Living people
People from Kvinnherad
Norwegian footballers
FK Haugesund players
SK Vard Haugesund players
Nest-Sotra Fotball players
Viking FK players
Norwegian Second Division players
Norwegian First Division players
Eliteserien players
Association football midfielders
Sportspeople from Vestland